Basic Math (a.k.a. Fun With Numbers) is an educational cartridge for the Atari Video Computer System (later called the Atari 2600) developed by Gary Palmer of Atari, Inc. The game was one of the nine launch titles offered when the Atari 2600 went on sale in September 1977.

Gameplay

The player's objective is to solve basic arithmetic problems. Game variations determine whether the player solves addition, subtraction, multiplication, or division problems, and whether he/she could select the top number (the console randomly selects the lower number).

The player uses the joystick to enter an answer to the math problem. The game uses sound effects to signal whether the answer is right or wrong. If the player's answer is incorrect the game will then show the correct answer.

Reception
Basic Math was reviewed in Video magazine as part of a general review of the Atari VCS. It was described as "very basic" with reviewers drolly noting that "the controls of this game may be a little more complicated than the actual problems", and the game was scored a 5 out of 10.

See also

List of Atari 2600 games
Math Gran Prix (1982)

References

1977 video games
Atari 2600 games
Atari games
Children's educational video games
North America-exclusive video games
Video games developed in the United States